Jarantowice may refer to the following places:
Jarantowice, Radziejów County in Kuyavian-Pomeranian Voivodeship (north-central Poland)
Jarantowice, Wąbrzeźno County in Kuyavian-Pomeranian Voivodeship (north-central Poland)
Jarantowice, Włocławek County in Kuyavian-Pomeranian Voivodeship (north-central Poland)